Temirkhan is an Asian name of Turkic origin.

People with the name 

 Avaz Temirkhan (born 1959), Azerbaijani politician

 Temirkhan Dosmukhanbetov (born 1949), Kazakh politician

Surnames
Kazakh masculine given names
Azerbaijani-language surnames
Surnames of Turkish origin